Clement Browne (28 July 1865 – 24 July 1927) was a Barbadian cricketer. He played in fourteen first-class matches for the Barbados cricket team from 1891 to 1900.

See also
 List of Barbadian representative cricketers

References

External links
 

1865 births
1927 deaths
Barbadian cricketers
Barbados cricketers
People from Christ Church, Barbados